Jonatan Binotto (born 22 January 1975) is an Italian former footballer who played as a midfielder.

Club career

Early career
Binotto started his professional career in 1993 at Juventus F.C. He spent two seasons on loan at Serie B clubs, before joining Hellas Verona F.C., who were in Serie A at that time. He struggled to break into the first team, however, and remained with the team until the club's relegation in the summer of 1997.

Bologna
He then joined Bologna F.C. 1909 in the summer of 1998 in a co-ownership deal, for 150 million lire, where he played 62 Serie A games in three seasons. In May 2000 Bologna bought Binotto outright for 10 billion lire, but in pure player swap, and Bologna bought back most of the players for free, made the deal purely financial tricks.

Internazionale
He was signed by Internazionale in June 2001, in a co-ownership deal, in exchange for Fabio Macellari, who went to Bologna. Both Binotto and Macellari were "valued" at 12 billion lire (€6,197,483).

He was immediately loaned out to Chievo, Brescia and Como.

Late career
Binotto returned to Bologna in January 2004, after the co-ownership deal was terminated ca. January 2003, but not until the summer of 2004 was he included in the team again. He then played for Pistoiese and Triestina in the 2005–06 season, and Casalecchio of Eccellenza in the 2006–07 season.

Footnotes

References

External links
 Player statistics
 Official national team profile

1975 births
Living people
People from Montebelluna
Italian footballers
Italy under-21 international footballers
Juventus F.C. players
Ascoli Calcio 1898 F.C. players
A.C. Cesena players
Hellas Verona F.C. players
Bologna F.C. 1909 players
Inter Milan players
A.C. ChievoVerona players
Brescia Calcio players
Como 1907 players
U.S. Pistoiese 1921 players
U.S. Triestina Calcio 1918 players
Serie A players
Serie B players
Association football midfielders
Mediterranean Games gold medalists for Italy
Mediterranean Games medalists in football
Competitors at the 1997 Mediterranean Games
Sportspeople from the Province of Treviso
Footballers from Veneto